WNRB may refer to:

 Wisconsin Natural Resources Board, governing body of the Wisconsin Department of Natural Resources
 WNRB-LP, a low power community radio station in Wausau, Wisconsin

See also
 WFNR, which operated as radio station WNRB during 1984 in Virginia
 WMEX (AM), which operated as radio station WNRB during 1995–2001 in the Boston area
 WYOH, which operated as radio station WNRB during 1990–1994 in Ohio
 WNBR (disambiguation), a transposition of WNRB